Meghann Fahy (born 1989/1990) is an American actress. Her first prominent role was playing Hannah O'Connor on the ABC daytime soap opera One Life to Live from 2010 to 2012. She starred as Sutton Brady on the Freeform drama series The Bold Type, which ran from 2017 to 2021. In 2022, Fahy played Daphne on the second season of the HBO series The White Lotus. On Broadway, she starred as Natalie Goodman in the stage musical Next to Normal from 2010 to 2011.

Personal life
From a young age, Fahy sang at various events around her hometown of Longmeadow, Massachusetts. However, her first stage role was playing Dorothy Gale in her Longmeadow High School senior class performance of The Wizard of Oz. Fahy night waitressed at The Grey Dog in New York City and nannied at the onset of her career.

Career

Theater
During the summer of 2008, Fahy attended open calls and was cast as the standby for Jennifer Damiano as Natalie Goodman in Arena Stage's production of Next to Normal in late 2008. She remained with the cast during its transfer to the Booth Theatre on Broadway, which began previews on March 27, 2009. On July 19, 2010, after Damiano departed the cast to prepare for the Broadway musical Spider-Man: Turn Off the Dark the day prior, Fahy took over as the principal actor for Natalie along with Marin Mazzie as mother Diana and Jason Danieley as father Dan. MacKenzie Mauzy replaced her as the standby for Natalie. Fahy played the role on Broadway until its closing on January 16, 2011.

In December 2010, it was announced that Fahy had been cast in readings of a stage adaptation based upon the 1992 Disney cult classic Newsies. Paper Mill Playhouse took on the musical for its 2011–12 season, with the production running from September 15 to October 16, 2011, though Fahy did not participate in that production. She has also recorded demos for composers' works, such as Bree Lowdermilk and Kait Kerrigan's The Unauthorized Autobiography of Samantha Brown in 2009, and continues to perform in concert revues as the title character as recently as March 1, 2011.

In May 2011, Meghann briefly reprised her role as Natalie Goodman in the first national tour of Next to Normal in the first week of the St. Paul, Minnesota stop. Emma Hunton, who had been cast in the tour, took a leave of absence to complete a workshop in New York City. Fahy joined the rest of the principal tour cast for her stint: Alice Ripley as Diana, Asa Somers as Dan, Jeremy Kushnier as Dr. Madden, and Preston Sadleir as Henry. In July 2011, it was announced that Fahy had been cast in The Unauthorized Autobiography of Samantha Brown at Goodspeed Opera House. She reprised her role as the title character when performances began August 4, 2011, and continued through August 28, 2011. 

In January 2012, Fahy appeared in a one-night concert reading of Twilight: The Musical at New World Stages as Bella. In January 2015, Fahy participated in a production of We Are The Tigers at Feinstein's/54 Below, singing as Riley Williams.

Television and film
Fahy first appeared on ABC's One Life to Live in February 2010 as college student Hannah O'Connor. She has described her character in these terms: "stalked an ex-boyfriend; overdosed on painkillers; has a fixation on a coed; witnessed a crime." The role ended in November 2010, with Fahy appearing as Hannah in two subsequent episodes in January 2012.

Other television credits include a guest appearance on the series Gossip Girl as Devyn. In 2011, Fahy appeared in the Hallmark Hall of Fame film The Lost Valentine as a young 1940s-era mother, Caroline Thomas, with Betty White as Caroline in present-day and Jennifer Love Hewitt as a reporter learning of Caroline's story. The following year, Fahy appeared in the miniseries Political Animals as ambitious blogger Georgia, and guest starred on Necessary Roughness as Olivia DiFlorio, tutor-turned-girlfriend of the main character's son.

In 2016, Fahy was cast as Sutton Brady in the Freeform drama series The Bold Type, which premiered on June 20, 2017. She has won praise for her performance in this role, with one reviewer noting that "Fahy, giving one of TV's most charming and underrated performances, continues to define the show's fizzy, occasionally bawdy comic streak with exquisite timing and a particular aptitude for punchlines that hurt just a little bit". In November 2020, she was cast in a co-starring role in the drama film The Unbreakable Boy.

In February 2022, Fahy was cast in a starring role playing Daphne Sullivan, a woman vacationing with her husband, in the second season of the HBO drama series The White Lotus. She had auditioned for Alexandra Daddario's role in the first season of The White Lotus. Her performance in the second season was praised, with Vanity Fair proclaiming that Fahy would be the "breakout" star of the series' second season. Adrian Horton of The Guardian also lauded Fahy and declared that it was "Fahy's performance that elevates her [character] from dimensional to thrillingly unpredictable and inscrutable." Along with her castmates, in February 2023, Fahy garnered an SAG Award for Outstanding Performance by an Ensemble in a Drama Series.

Filmography

Film

Television

Stage
 Next to Normal (2010–2011), at Booth Theatre: as Natalie (replacement)
 We Are The Tigers (2015), at 54 Below: as Riley Williams

References

External links
 
 

1990 births
21st-century American actresses
21st-century American singers
Actresses from Massachusetts
American film actresses
American soap opera actresses
American stage actresses
American television actresses
Living people
People from Longmeadow, Massachusetts
Singers from Massachusetts
21st-century American women singers